Joseph Nicholson Barney (1818 – June 16, 1899) was a career United States Navy officer (1835–1861) who served in the Confederate States Navy in the American Civil War (1861–1865).

Personal life and family 
Barney was born in Baltimore in 1818, the son of U.S. Congressman John Barney and Elizabeth Nicholson Hindman and the grandson of United States Navy Commodore Joshua Barney. He married Eliza Jacobs Rogers on June 9, 1846 in New Castle County, Delaware, with whom he had one daughter before her death in 1848. He married a second time in 1858 to Anne (Nannie) Seddon Dornin, daughter of Thomas Aloysius Dornin, with whom he had eight children. He died at his home in Fredericksburg, Virginia, aged 81, on June 16, 1899, after a month-long illness. His second wife died on October 11, 1913.

His grandson Thomas Holcomb was Commandant of the United States Marine Corps (1936–1943) and first Marine to achieve the rank of general.

United States Navy 
He entered a naval academy in 1832 and received a warrant in the United States Navy as a midshipman in 1835, was promoted to passed midshipman in 1841, the first of 22 passed by the board of examination. By 1843, he was acting master of the USS Vincennes. He was promoted to lieutenant in 1847.

His postings included the USS Potomac, USS Columbia, USS Vincennes, USS Cyane, the Norfolk Naval Shipyard, and USS Susquehanna. In 1861, at the beginning of the American Civil War, he held the position of first lieutenant on the USS Susquehanna in the Mediterranean Sea. Upon returning to the United States on June 6, he resigned his commission the same day.

Confederate States Navy
Barney was appointed a lieutenant in the Confederate States Navy on July 2, 1861. After the Confederate evacuation of Norfolk, the Jamestown was scuttled to block the James River at Drewry's Bluff. In the subsequent Battle of Drewry's Bluff, in which Confederate shore batteries drove off a Union Navy force heading towards Richmond, the Jamestown's guns were considered the main factor in repulsing the enemy ships. Following the battle, he received praise from the Confederate Congress and was promoted to commander.

In early 1863, Barney was briefly assigned command of naval operations in Galveston, including the revenue cutter Harriet Lane, captured in the Battle of Galveston. However the ship was already under command of Leon Smith, an army volunteer and steamboat captain, who had played a role in capturing the ship, having been placed in command of the ship by Major General John B. Magruder and in control of additional ships improvised as a "cottonclad fleet". The ship was also considered by the navy to be too slow and inefficient to become a blockade runner, though it was later used in this capacity. Following discussions with Magruder, who was not willing to relinquish controls of the cottonclads, Barney conceded the appointment, and in a letter to Confederate Naval Secretary Stephen Mallory, recommended that the navy relinquish control. Barney later explained that he made his recommendation since he considered that the presence of two separate marine forces with independent commanders would lead to discord and confusion.

Barney was sent to Europe in spring 1863. He assumed command of the Confederate raider CSS Florida in September 1863, relieving the ailing John Newland Maffitt, and oversaw her refit at Brest, France, but had to be detached due to ill health before the Florida put to sea. From 1864 to 1865, he was a Confederate naval agent in Europe. 

He returned to the United States following the war, and took the Oath of Allegiance to the U.S. Constitution in September 1865.

Later life 
After the Civil War ended, Barney retired to Powhatan County, Virginia, before moving to Fredericksburg in 1874. Barney was active in the insurance business there until retiring in 1895. He was also an elder in the Presbyterian Church.

Barney and his wife were active in activities promoting the memory of the Confederacy. His wife played a role in fundraising for a Confederate memorial in Fredericksburg as secretary of the city's Ladies' Memorial Association, which funded the monument. Joseph and Bradley T. Johnson led the unveiling ceremony of the monument in 1891.

See also

 Letterbook of Joseph Nicholson Barney, Special Collections Branch, United States Naval Academy
 Joseph Nicholson Barney Log and Diary, 1839–1852, Southern Historical Collection

Notes

References

1818 births
1899 deaths
Confederate States Navy commanders
People of Maryland in the American Civil War
United States Navy officers